The Mike Neun Show was a Canadian music variety television series which aired on CBC Television from 1970 to 1971.

Premise
Episodes of this music variety series were filmed on location at the North Vancouver Centennial Centre with additional segments recorded in various Vancouver locations. Comedian Mike Neun (In the Round) hosted with Doug Parker's house band. Visiting performers included Eleanor Collins, Chief Dan George, Pat Hervey and Terry David Mulligan.

Scheduling
This half-hour series was broadcast Mondays at 7:30 p.m. from 21 September 1970 to 29 March 1971.

References

External links
 

CBC Television original programming
1970 Canadian television series debuts
1971 Canadian television series endings
1970s Canadian variety television series
Television shows filmed in Vancouver